The most valuable companies in India:

2021 
Top 10 companies in India in 2021 by market capitalization.

2018 
Top 10 companies in India in 2018 by market capitalization. Some companies are part of Conglomerate (company), which makes the parent company much more valuable than its listed entities. Read the article to check out the list of stocks

2016-17

2017-18

See also
 List of largest companies in India
 List of public corporations by market capitalization
 List of largest companies by revenue

References

Valuable